Customer Alliance is a software-as-a-service solution provider headquartered in Berlin, Germany. 

The company specialises in customer experience management and online reputation management. The platform collects voice of the customer feedback across all major online review portals, analyses this feedback, and provides measurement and target-setting in the areas of Net Promoter Scores (NPS), customer satisfaction, quantitative, semantic and trend analysis. 

The company is made up of employees from around 18 different nationalities who service customers from 35 different countries over Europe and North America.

History 
Torsten Sabel and Moritz Klussmann co-founded Customer Alliance in 2009, creating software tools for hotels, starting with the German hospitality market. Since then, the company has grown to serve an international clientele base and has expanded its services to the automotive and ecommerce industries as well. 

In 2010, Customer Alliance won second place in the "Sprungbrett" competition in the category "Best Startup". The competition was the highlight of the "Online Innovation Days" of the Verband Internet Reisevertrieb e.V. (VIR), supported by Messe Berlin GmbH, and took place for the third time in a row.  

In 2011, the company received a six-digit seed investment from Mountain Super Angel and Hightech Gründerfonds. 

In 2012, Customer Alliance became an official partner of the German Hotel Association (Deutscher Hotelverband IHA). Moreover, the SaaS solution provider won the German Silicon Valley Accelerator. Twice a year, the award brings six German start-ups to Silicon Valley to help them expand their network. The program is supported by the Federal Ministry of Economics and Technology. In the same year, the company opened another branch in Querétaro, Mexico, to expand the business in South America.  

In June 2019, Customer Alliance announced its merger with Toocan, which is a Berlin-based company known for its tool the HotelNavigator. This tool enables hotels to collect and evaluate guest feedback while monitoring online reviews.

References

External links

Companies based in Berlin
Software companies of Germany